Dídac Lee i Hsing (李西洵) (born January 15, 1974) is a Spanish entrepreneur and Business Angel, Co-Founder and Managing Partner at Galdana Ventures.

Biography
Dídac Lee was born in Figueres, Spain to Taiwanese parents. At 21 years old and against the opinion of his family, Lee left his studies in Computer Engineering to start his first company. The beginnings were rough, he had limited resources and started his company with a bank loan of 18,000 Euros.

In 1998 he founded Scubastore.com, origin of the current group TradeInn, the first network of online stores specializing in sports equipment ecommerce and European leader in its sector, an online stores specialized in sports equipment for diving, cycling, hiking, tennis and paddle tennis, swimming, bike, fishing and skiing. Today TradeInn is one of the top European outdoor e-commerce, with 17 individual stores, each one of them specialized in a different sport, counting 14 verticals and 300M in turnover in the last year alone.

Lee founded and co-founded several tech companies (among others: Inspirit, Fhios, OBS Threepoints, JV with Planeta, Safe365) of which he currently serves as board member and reference shareholder; jointly they currently account for 800 employees worldwide.

In 2015, Lee co-founded Galdana Ventures, a 1B USD fund invested in some of the Top Tier firms in Silicon Valley (50%), China (30%) and Europe (20%).

Galdana Ventures is considered one of the best performing Venture Capital Fund of Funds globally, its funds invest in some of the best Venture Capital firms who are backing the game changing companies of the future. Galdana’s management team has more than 100 years of accumulated experience as successful entrepreneurs and investors.

Lee is well known in the start-up world as Business Angel, he invested in some of the most successful start-ups in the Spanish ecosystem (Badi, Housfy, Exoticca, Paack, Glovo, LingoKids).

Entrepreneurship 
 Scubastore.com (TradeINN.com)
 The Etailers 
 Fhios 
 Hotelerum (Travel Compositor)
 Safe365 
 OBS Threepoints 
 Galdana Ventures

Dídac Lee and FC Barcelona
Lee is a former board member of FC Barcelona, he served on the board for 10 years from 2010 to 2020. Since 2018, he was head of Digital, an internationally recognized reference in its field, with 370 million followers in social media and more than 100M Euros in turnover. Among Lee´s achievements at FCB, one of the biggest is the leading of the digitalization of the Club; his legacy is applauded by many.

Over the years, Didac has been nationally and internationally recognized by the press as one of the most knowledgeable expert in the Digital Sports sector. During his time at FCB, he was the official spokesman of the FC Barcelona Digital Area and he was regularly interviewed by the main sports media worldwide:

 Sports Business (US): https://www.sportbusiness.com/news/lockdown-created-favourable-conditions-for-barcelonas-ott-launch-says-digital-chief/
 Sports Pro (US): https://www.sportspromedia.com/analysis/fc-barcelona-barcatv-streaming-revenue-ott-strategy-rakuten
 Off the Pitch (US): https://offthepitch.com/a/interview-barcelona-board-member-content-going-be-new-core-business-barca
 Hashtag Sports (US): https://engage.hashtagsports.com/2020/02/24/fc-barcelona-fortnite-netflix-digital-strategy/
 Forbes (US): https://www.forbes.com/sites/tomsanderson/2020/06/03/fc-barcelona-launch-bara-tv-and-culer-membership-program/#2c8cfbd54dd9
 Sportico (US): https://www.sportico.com/business/media/2020/fc-barcelona-soccer-team-launches-digital-service-249/
 Los Angeles Times (US): https://www.latimes.com/sports/soccer/story/2020-06-04/antoine-griezmann-mls
 Yutang Sports (China) 
 Bein Mena (Middle East) 
 Daily Mail (UK)

Dídac is often invited as Guest Speaker at Sport Conferences and Events globally, some of the recent ones are: 
 ISE 2020, Agora Event: https://www.fcbarcelona.com/en/club/news/1609125/barcas-new-digital-strategy-features-at-ise-2020-in-amsterdam
 Sports Pro Live 2020: https://www.sportspromedia.com/news/barcelona-youtube-subscribers-video-streaming-platform-barca-studios
 SoccerEx Connected: https://www.fcbarcelona.com/en/club/news/1839096/didac-lee-tells-soccerex-about-the-barca-tv-project

Honors & Personal Life 
 2005: Best Technology Entrepreneur of the University of Cambridge.
 2006: Best Entrepreneur of the Year. Award granted by the AIJEC.
 2006: Award "Gironí de l’Any".
 2007: Ferrer Salat Award Entrepreneur of the Future, by Fomento del Trabajo.
 2007: Best Entrepreneur Award Overseas, by the Taiwanese government.
 2007: Award for Best Creative Young Entrepreneur Catalunya 2007, awarded by the Junior Chamber International Catalunya.
 2008: Award Empordà County Council l'Alt Empordà.
 2008: Internationalization Accesit in the National Young Entrepreneur Award, awarded by CEAJE.
 2010: Chosen by IESE as one of 20 entrepreneurs from 40 years of the country's most influential.
 2011: Finalist in the Entrepreneur Award for Entrepreneur Magazine.
 2012: Entrepreneur of the Year Award by Ideateca.
 2013: Best European Mentor, awarded by Founder Institute.
 2018: Doctor Honoris Causa from the 21st Century Business University 
 2019: Entrepreneur of the Year by PIMEC 
 2019: Best Business Angel by AEBAN 

Lee is a proud Figuerenc (Figueres is a small town located 140 km North East of Barcelona). When he is not traveling between China and the Silicon Valley, he lives in Barcelona and Figueres; he loves practicing adventure sports like quad and buggy racing, scuba diving and skateboarding. Since Dídac is currently on the scientific committee of FEDAS (Spanish Federation of sub-aquatic activities).

His parents emigrated from Taiwan to Spain more than 50 years ago, he is fluent in 5 languages including Mandarin Chinese.

References

External links
 LinkedIN: 
 Twitter: https://twitter.com/DidacLee
 Medium: https://medium.com/@ddaclee

1974 births
Spanish businesspeople
Living people
Spanish people of Taiwanese descent